Atop an Underwood: Early Stories and Other Writings is an anthology of American Beat writer Jack Kerouac's early work, published by Viking Press in 1999. It includes writings from Kerouac's high school years, poetry, short stories, essays and other previously unpublished works. The book includes an introduction by its editor Paul Marion along with notes on the stories included throughout the book.

References
 Atop an Underwood: Early Stories and Other Writings, 1999. 

1999 short story collections
Works by Jack Kerouac
American short story collections
Viking Press books